Tollyganj Assembly constituency is a Legislative Assembly constituency of South 24 Parganas district in the Indian state of West Bengal.

Overview
As per orders of the Delimitation Commission, No. 152 Tollygunge Assembly constituency is composed of the following: Ward Nos. 94, 95, 97, 98, 100, 111, 112, 113 and 114 of Kolkata Municipal Corporation.
Before 2011, Tollygunge Tollygunge Assembly constituency was composed of the following: Ward Nos. 81, 89, 94, 95, 97, 98 of Kolkata Municipal Corporation.

Tollygunge Assembly constituency is part of No. 22 Jadavpur (Lok Sabha constituency). Tollyganj was earlier part of Calcutta South (Lok Sabha constituency).

Members of Legislative Assembly

Election results

2021 election

2016 election

.# Swing calculated on Left Front+Congress vote percentages taken together in 2016.

2011
In the 2011 election, Aroop Biswas defeated his nearest rival Partha Pratim Biswas of CPI(M).

 

 
 

.# Swing calculated on Congress+Trinamool Congress vote percentages taken together in 2011.

2006
In the 2006 election, Aroop Biswas of Trinamool Congress defeated his nearest rival Partha Pratim Biswas of CPI(M).

 

 

.# Swing calculated on Trinamool Congress+BJP vote percentages taken together in 2006.

2001
In the 2001 election, Pankaj Kumar Banerjee defeated his nearest rival Goutam Banerjee of CPI(M).

 

 
 

.# Swing calculated on Congress+Trinamool Congress vote percentages taken together in 2001.

1996
In the 1996 election, Pankaj Kumar Banerjee of Congress defeated his nearest rival Ashis Roy of CPI(M).

1991
In the 1991 election, Prasanta Sur of CPIM defeated his nearest rival Pankaj Kumar Banerjee of Congress

1987
In the 1987 election, Prasanta Sur of CPIM defeated his nearest rival Pankaj Kumar Banerjee of Congress

1982
In the 1982 election, Prasanta Sur of CPIM defeated his nearest rival Asim Datta of Congress

1977
In the 1977 election, Prasanta Sur of CPIM defeated his nearest rival Pankaj Kumar Banerjee of Congress

1977-2006
In the 2006 state assembly elections, Aroop Biswas of Trinamool Congress won the Tollyganj seat defeating his nearest rival Dr. Partha Pratim Biswas of CPI(M). Contests in most years were multi cornered but only winners and runners are being mentioned. Pankaj Kumar Banerjee of Trinamool Congress defeated Goutam Banerjee of CPI(M) in 2001, and Ashis Roy of CPI(M) in 1996 representing Congress. Prasanta Sur of CPI(M) defeated Pankaj Kumar Banerjee of Congress in 1991 and 1987, Asim Dutta of Congress in 1982, and Pankaj Kumar Banerjee of Congress in 1977.

1952-1972
Pankaj Kumar Banerjee of Congress, won in 1972 defeating Prasanta Sur of CPIM. Satya Priya Roy of CPI(M) won in 1971. Niranjan Sengupta of CPI(M)/CPI won in 1969, 1967 and 1962. Haridas Mitra of PSP won in 1957. In independent India's first election in 1952 Tollyganj had two seats. Priya Ranjan Sen of Congress won from Tollyganj Uttar Assembly constituency and Ambica Chakraborty of CPI won from Tollyganj Dakshin Assembly constituency.

References

Notes

Citations

Assembly constituencies of West Bengal
Politics of South 24 Parganas district